David N. Savitt (May 23, 1928 – October 23, 2018) was a Democratic member of the Pennsylvania House of Representatives.

References

Democratic Party members of the Pennsylvania House of Representatives
1928 births
2018 deaths